Arkells is a Canadian rock band, formed in Hamilton, Ontario. In 2006, they signed with Dine Alone Records, and have since signed with Universal Records Canada and Last Gang Records. They are managed by Last Gang Management.  They have released six albums, two EPs and a number of singles that have charted in Canada. The band has won multiple Juno Awards, including one for their album High Noon in 2015. The band headlined the 108th Grey Cup halftime show in Hamilton, Ontario on December 12, 2021.

History

Formation (2006–2008) 
During their first few live shows the band called themselves Charlemagne but changed their name when another band of the same name threatened to sue them. The band is named after Arkell Street in the Westdale neighbourhood of Hamilton, near McMaster University, where they lived and would practice their music. All five original band members attended McMaster where lead singer Max Kerman graduated with an honours BA in Political Science. Kerman met guitarist Mike DeAngelis at a McMaster Welcome Week event where the two discovered they had an identical taste in music.

Jackson Square (2008–2011) 
Arkells' debut album Jackson Square was released 28 October 2008 on Dine Alone Records. In late 2008, Arkells toured Canada as opening act for Matt Mays & El Torpedo. Later that year, on November 22, they performed the halftime show at the Vanier Cup in their hometown. In early 2009 they toured with Waking Eyes across Canada. Arkells were featured on Aux.tv's Alt Sessions where they performed their full EP.

In October, 2009, Arkells won a favourite new artist CASBY Award (short for Canadian Artists Selected by You) from Toronto radio station 102.1 The Edge at a ceremony and concert at Toronto's Kool Haus. The band also performed at the event.

In April 2010, Arkells won the Juno Award for New Group of the Year, and on May 15, 2010, were picked to open for Them Crooked Vultures at the Air Canada Centre in Toronto.

They made headlines while playing a set at Horseshoe Tavern in Toronto after the 2010 Much Music Video Awards, when rapper Shad and pop singer Kesha joined them onstage to freestyle and sing along during a cover of Ms. Jackson by Outkast.

Michigan Left (2011–2014) 
In 2011, the band wrote and recorded their second album Michigan Left, which was released on October 18 of that year. The first single, "Whistleblower", was released to iTunes on July 5, 2011. "Whistleblower" has also been used as the Intro Music to the 2011–2012 Calgary Hitmen hockey team and featured in EA Sports' NHL 13 video game. The band also released a second song, "Kiss Cam", in July.

On 6 October 2011 it was announced that Dan Griffin would be leaving the band to go back to school. He was replaced by Anthony Carone.

In 2012, Arkells won the 2012 Juno Award for Group of the Year.

The band has become known for performing spontaneous Motown cover sets, most recently at Canada House during the PyeongChang 2018 Olympics, and while stranded in St. John's Newfoundland. In September 2012, the band played Jian Ghomeshi's "1982" book launch in Toronto. The band has also started a tradition of sending fans signed postcards and free downloads at Christmas.

High Noon (2014–2016) 
On April 7, 2014, Arkells released the first track, "Never Thought That This Would Happen", from their third album, which was produced by Tony Hoffer (Beck, The Kooks, M83). One month later, on May 13, the band released the album's first single "Come to Light", and confirmed the title of the record would be High Noon. The record was released on Dine Alone/Universal Records, August 5, 2014.

Arkells have toured extensively, including tours in the United States with Lights, Tokyo Police Club, The Postelles, X Ambassadors, and Lydia; European touring with Billy Talent, Augustines, British Sea Power, and Anti-Flag as well as Canadian touring with Metric, the Tragically Hip, Hollerado, and Sam Roberts.

At the Juno Awards of 2015, Arkells won the Juno Award for Group of the Year and the Juno Award for Rock Album of the Year. High Noon was also long listed for the Polaris prize in 2015.

On October 23, 2015, the band released a new EP, "Study Music", which they self-produced and released on Universal Music Canada/Dine Alone Records.

Morning Report (2016–2018) 
Arkells began teasing new material from their forthcoming album on tour in the spring of 2016. The fourth album, Morning Report, was released on August 5, 2016. The first single, "Private School", debuted on May 6, 2016, and charted at number 1 that summer. The video features cameos from Lights, Dave Monks of Tokyo Police Club and Steve Jocz (formerly of Sum 41), who also directed the video.

The Arkells song "Round and Round" was featured in the soundtrack of the EA Sports game NHL 17.

At the Juno Awards of 2017, Arkells were nominated for Juno Award for Group of the Year and the Juno Award for Rock Album of the Year. They performed their viral hit "Drake's Dad" live on the television broadcast.

Arkells released a new single on April 7, 2017, entitled "Knocking at the Door". The track shot to number 1 on the Canadian alt/rock charts, where it spent 14 weeks at #1. It also became their first #1 Active Rock single. They performed the track live that summer on the 2017 NHL Awards in Las Vegas and the 2017 iHeartRadio MMVAs in Toronto. In the summer of 2017, the band toured the festival circuit, playing Coachella Valley Music and Arts Festival, Osheaga Festival, and Sasquatch! Music Festival. Later in the year, the track cracked the US ALT chart, peaking at #39.

In February 2018, the band was invited to South Korea to perform for the Canadian Olympic team during the 2018 Winter Olympics. In June 2018, the band played at Tim Hortons Field in their hometown of Hamilton for a crowd of 24,000 people. It was the largest crowd for an outdoor show in Hamilton since Pink Floyd drew 50,000 to Ivor Wynne Stadium in 1975.

On August 15, 2018, the band announced that their fifth studio album, Rally Cry, would be released on October 19, 2018. 

On September 20, 2018, the band performed at WE Day in Toronto.

Rally Cry (2018–2021) 
On June 23, 2018, Arkells hosted a major hometown concert, dubbed "The Rally", at Tim Hortons Field in Hamilton, Ontario. The concert was paired with several events across the city including a market outside the stadium, a bike ride to the show, and featured Ellevator, Bishop Briggs, and Cold War Kids.

Arkells released their fifth studio album, Rally Cry, on October 19, 2018, accompanied by a Canadian tour featuring Lord Huron as the opening act. The tour featured the Arkells' largest arena show yet, at the Scotiabank Arena in Toronto on February 16, 2019.

On February 25, 2020, the band released the new single and video "Years in the Making".

On July 30, they released the single "Quitting You", and announced the release of Campfire Chords, a full-length album featuring acoustic versions of earlier songs, on August 20. Each member recorded his part at home during the COVID-19 quarantine and sent it to Carone, who then edited, mixed and produced the pieces into complete songs.

Blink Once and Blink Twice (2021–present) 
On March 25, 2021, the band released the new single and video "You Can Get It", featuring guest vocals by K.Flay The single “All Roads” was later released. Both of these singles were included on the band’s sixth studio album Blink Once, which was released on September 22, 2021.

On December 12, 2021, the band performed at halftime of the 108th Grey Cup at Tim Horton's Field in Hamilton.

On June 23, 2022, the band announced that their studio album Blink Twice will be released on September 23. The album features collaborations with Cold War Kids, Aly and AJ, Tegan and Sara and Beatrice Martin.

After two years of postponements due to the COVID-19 pandemic, the band held the second edition of "The Rally" at Tim Hortons Field in Hamilton, Ontario on June 25, 2022. The show featured similar events to the first event in 2018, with a market, bike ride to the show, as well as the unveiling of a collaboration with several organizations to renovate a local basketball court as an effort to improve sport in the community. The concert was their largest yet with 27,000 fans in attendance and featured openers Haviah Mighty, K.Flay, and Mt. Joy.

Song influences
Arkells prominently feature political motivations in their music. Examples include "Knocking at the Door," which was written about The Women's March on Washington; "The Ballad of Hugo Chavez" about the Venezuelan president as a political prisoner, "People's Champ" in protest of US president Donald Trump; and "Whistleblower" about journalists blowing the whistle and exposing truth behind closed doors.
Another example being “No Champagne Socialist” about a student in New York of the 1960s struggling with himself about trying to represent the working class as a member of the upper class.

The band has also spoken about their diverse musical influences from Top 40 to Motown.

Band members
Max Kerman – vocals, guitar (2006–present)
Mike DeAngelis – vocals, guitar (2006–present)
Nick Dika – bass (2006–present)
Tim Oxford – drums, percussion (2006–present)
Anthony Carone – vocals, keyboard, guitar (2011–present)

Past members
Dan Griffin – vocals, keyboard, guitar (2006–2011)

Timeline

Discography

Albums

Extended plays

Singles

Notes

References

External links

Arkells Website Official Band Website
Alt Sessions Arkells on Aux.tv

Musical groups established in 2006
Musical groups from Hamilton, Ontario
Canadian alternative rock groups
Dine Alone Records artists
2006 establishments in Ontario
Juno Award for Rock Album of the Year winners
Juno Award for Breakthrough Group of the Year winners
Juno Award for Group of the Year winners